Crooner is a term used to describe primarily male singers who performed using a smooth style made possible by better microphones which picked up quieter sounds and a wider range of frequencies, allowing the singer to access a more dynamic range and perform in a more intimate manner. It is derived from the old verb "to croon" (meaning "to speak or sing softly"). This suggestion of intimacy was supposedly wildly attractive to women, especially younger ones such as teenage girls, known at the time as "bobby soxers". The crooning style developed out of singers who performed with big bands, and reached its height in the 1940s to late 60s.

Crooning is epitomised by jazz vocalists like Bing Crosby and Frank Sinatra, although Sinatra once said that he did not consider himself or Crosby to be "crooners". Other performers, such as Russ Columbo, also rejected the term.

History

This dominant popular vocal style coincided with the advent of radio broadcasting and electrical recording. Before the advent of the microphone, popular singers like Al Jolson had to project to the rear seats of a theater, as did opera singers, which made for a very loud vocal style. The microphone made possible the more personal style. Al Bowlly, Bing Crosby, Gene Austin, Art Gillham and, by some historical accounts, Vaughn De Leath are often credited as inventors of the crooning style, but Rudy Vallée achieved more widespread popularity, beginning in 1928; he could be heard by anyone with a phonograph or a radio.

His first film, The Vagabond Lover, was promoted with the line, "Men Hate Him! Women Love Him!" while his success brought press warnings of the "Vallee Peril": this "punk from Maine" with the "dripping voice" required mounted police to "beat back crowds of screaming and swooning females" at his vaudeville shows.

By the early 1930s, the term "crooner" had taken on a pejorative connotation. Cardinal William O'Connell of Boston and the New York Singing Teachers Association (NYSTA) both publicly denounced the vocal form, O'Connell calling it "base", "degenerate", "defiling" and un-American, with the NYSTA adding "corrupt". Even The New York Times predicted that crooning would be just a passing fad. The newspaper wrote, "They sing like that because they can't help it. Their style is begging to go out of fashion…. Crooners will soon go the way of tandem bicycles, mah jongg and midget golf." Voice range shifted from tenor (Vallée) to baritone (Russ Columbo, Bing Crosby). Still, a 1931 record by Dick Robertson, "Crosby, Columbo & Vallee", called upon men to fight "these public enemies" brought into homes via radio.

Some female singers, such as Vaughn De Leath, Annette Hanshaw, Mildred Bailey (at the beginning of her career), Harriet Lee, and Helen Rowland have been cited in the category of crooners.

Country crooners
Due to the country songs popularized by Bing Crosby, the crooning style of singing became an enduring part of country music. Crosby achieved a million seller with his 1940 rendition of the song "San Antonio Rose", originally recorded by Bob Wills & His Texas Playboys. In 1942, Perry Como had a smash hit with "Deep in the Heart of Texas"; Crosby, who had an enormous influence on Como, covered this song and took it to the number 3 position in the US chart that same year. Eddy Arnold, Jim Reeves and Ray Price are especially well known for their country crooner standards.

Dean Martin is associated with the country music he recorded in the period when he was working for Reprise Records, whilst his fellow Italian-American crooner Como recorded several albums with country producer Chet Atkins in Nashville. Regular, non-country crooners also scored hits with pop versions of country songs: Tony Bennett had a Billboard number 1 hit in 1951 with his rendition of Hank Williams' "Cold, Cold Heart"; Como had a number 1 hit in 1953 with his version of "Don't Let the Stars Get in Your Eyes", a chart-topping country hit for its author Slim Willet and a number 4 country hit for Ray Price; Guy Mitchell scored a number 1 in 1959 with "Heartaches by the Number", a country hit for Ray Price; and Britain's Engelbert Humperdinck achieved a 1967 UK number 1 hit with "Release Me", another song already made famous by Price in 1954. In 1970, Price had a number 1 US country hit and a number 11 Hot 100 hit with the song "For the Good Times", written by Kris Kristofferson; subsequently, Como's rendition reached number 7 in 1973 on the UK Singles Chart.

See also
List of crooners

References
Notes

Further reading

 Gary Giddins, Bing Crosby: A Pocketful of Dreams: The Early Years, 1903–1940. Boston: Little, Brown and Co., 2001.
 Allison McCracken, Real Men Don't Sing: Crooning in American Culture. Durham, NC: Duke University Press, 2015.